Michael Blümelhuber (born September 23, 1865, Christkindl, Unterhimmel-Christkindl (now a part of Steyr), Upper Austria — January 1936, Steyr) was a famous Austrian metalcutter. In 1910 he founded a master craftsman studio in Steyr, which closed in 1943. By the use of the Ajoure technique (often mislabeled as filigree) he brought metalcutting to a higher artistic level. He became internationally known through his participation in the World Fairs 1900 in Paris and 1902 in London.

References 
 http://aeiou.iicm.tugraz.at/aeiou.encyclop.b/b575211.htm

1865 births
1936 deaths
19th-century Austrian people
20th-century Austrian people
19th-century engravers
20th-century engravers
Austrian engravers
People from Steyr